Jindřich Trapl (24 March 1942 – 29 March 2010), was a Czech chess International Master (IM) (1977), Czechoslovak Chess Championship medalist (1967), European Team Chess Championship individual medalist (1961).

Biography
From the early 1960s to the early 1970s, Jindřich Trapl was one of the leading Czechoslovakian chess players. He was a multiple participant in the Czechoslovak Chess Championships, where he achieved his best in 1967 when he became a bronze medalist behind winner Július Kozma and silver medalist Jan Smejkal. In 1977, Jindřich Trapl was awarded the FIDE International Master (IM) title.

Jindřich Trapl played for Czechoslovakia in Chess Olympiads participated 2 times (1962, 1972); and in the European Team Chess Championship participated in 1961 and won individual gold medal.

In later years, Jindřich Trapl active participated in correspondence chess tournaments. He won with Czech Republic team 11th Correspondence Chess Olympiad (1992–1999).

References

External links

Jindřich Trapl chess games at 365chess.com

1942 births
2010 deaths
Czechoslovak chess players
Czech chess players
Chess International Masters
Chess Olympiad competitors